Ruđina Balšić (1396–1420) was a Zetan noblewoman  and ruled upon today  Montenegro and Albanian territory from the Balšić family. She married Mrkša Žarković and inherited his realm, the Principality of Valona, when he died in 1414. After unsuccessful negotiations to sell her duchy to the Venetians, the Ottomans captured it in 1417. Ruđina fled Valona to Zeta where she was governess of Budva from 1418. In 1420, during the Second Scutari War, she surrendered Budva to the Venetians without any resistance and moved to Dubrovnik with the town's treasury.

Family and marriage 

Ruđina (or Rugina, Rudina) was the daughter of Balša II, the lord of Zeta (1378–85), and Komnena Asen daughter of John Komnenos Asen. In 1391 Ruđina married nobleman Mrkša Žarković. Their marriage was blessed by the Archbishop of Ohrid, although it was seen as noncanonical because they were close relatives. In 1397 she and her mother were given citizenship of the Republic of Ragusa.

Duchess of Valona, Kanina, Himare and Berat 
After her husband's death in 1414, Ruđina inherited control over Valona (Vlorë) and held it until it fell to the Ottomans in 1417. She offered Valona to the Republic of Venice in exchange for 10,000 ducats. The Venetians were interested in gaining control over Valona in order to prevent the Ottomans from controlling entrance into the Adriatic Sea. While the Venetians prolonged negotiations with Ruđina hoping to get a better price, the Ottomans captured Valona in June 1417.

Governess of Budva 
After the Ottoman conquest of Valona, Ruđina had to flee, first to Corfu and then to Zeta, which was ruled by her nephew, Balša III, who entrusted her with the governorship of the coastal town of Budva in 1418. When the Venetians sent a naval squadron to the port of Budva in 1419 during the Second Scutari War, Ruđina surrendered the town without any resistance and fled to the Republic of Ragusa (Dubrovnik) with the town's treasury.

References

Sources 

 
 
 
 
 
 

Rudina
Asen dynasty